The 1984 European Super Cup was an association football match between Italian team Juventus and English team Liverpool, which took place on 16 January 1985 at the Stadio Comunale. The match was the annual European Super Cup contested between the winners of the European Cup and European Cup Winners' Cup. This was the first European Super Cup to be played over a single leg; due to fixture congestion, only the Turin leg was played.

Juventus were appearing in the Super Cup for the first time. Liverpool were appearing in the competition for the third time, they had won the competition in 1977, and lost in 1978 to Belgian team Anderlecht. Juventus won the 1983–84 European Cup Winners' Cup, beating Portuguese team Porto 2–1 in the final. Liverpool qualified by winning the 1983–84 European Cup. They beat Italian team Roma 4–2 in a penalty shootout after the final had finished 1–1.

Watched by a crowd of 55,384, Juventus took the lead in the first half when Zbigniew Boniek scored in the 39th minute. Boniek scored again in the second half to give Juventus a 2–0 lead which they held on to until the end of the match to win their first Super Cup. The two clubs met later in the season in the 1985 European Cup Final, which resulted in the death of 39 spectators due to a disaster that occurred prior to kick-off. Juventus won the match 1–0.

Match

Background
The European Super Cup was founded in the early 1970s, as a means to determine the best team in Europe and serve as a challenge to Ajax, the strongest club side of its day. The proposal by Dutch journalist Anton Witkamp, a football match between the holders of the European Cup and Cup Winners' Cup, failed to receive UEFA's backing, given the recent Cup Winners' Cup winners Rangers had been banned from European competition. Witkamp nonetheless proceeded with his vision, a two-legged match played between Ajax and Rangers in January 1973. The competition was endorsed and recognised by UEFA a year later.

Juventus qualified for the Super Cup as the reigning European Cup Winners' Cup winners. They had remained unbeaten throughout the 1983–84 European Cup Winners' Cup, and beat Porto 2–1 in the final. It was Juventus' first appearance in the competition.

Liverpool had qualified for the competition as a result of winning the 1983–84 European Cup. They had beaten Roma 4–2 in a penalty shootout, after the match had finished 1–1. Liverpool were appearing in their third Super Cup. They won the competition on their first appearance in 1977, beating German team Hamburg 7–1 on aggregate. Their other appearance in 1978 resulted in a defeat to Belgian team Anderlecht.

Traditionally, the Super Cup was played over two legs, but due to both clubs experiencing fixture congestion, was played as a one-off match in Turin in January 1985. The city was chosen randomly at the suggestion of Juventus president Giampiero Boniperti and Liverpool chief executive officer Peter Robinson.

Summary

Bad weather in Turin created doubt about whether the match could be completed. However, the referee decided to go ahead with the match. Liverpool were without striker Kenny Dalglish who was suspended. Liverpool struggled to gain a foothold in the match in the first half and were behind when Juventus scored in the 40th minute. A mishit pass by Massimo Briaschi found Zbigniew Boniek whose subsequent shot from the edge of the Liverpool penalty area beat goalkeeper Bruce Grobbelaar to give Juventus a 1–0 lead. Liverpool had a chance to equalise before the end of the first half, but midfielder John Wark put his shot wide of the Juventus goal. Liverpool started the second half without defender Mark Lawrenson who had injured himself during the first half, he was replaced by Gary Gillespie. Liverpool tried to level the match in the second half, but their best chances came from midfielder Ronnie Whelan whose shots from distance did not result in any goals. Juventus extended their lead late in the second half when Boniek scored again. A cross from Briaschi found Boniek, whose shot beat Grobbelaar to extend Juventus' lead to 2–0. Five minutes later, Juventus nearly extended their lead again. However, striker Paolo Rossi's shot was saved by Grobbelaar. Juventus held onto their lead to win the match 2–0 and win the Super Cup.

Details

Post-match
The two sides met again at the end of the season in the 1985 European Cup Final. However, the events of the match were overshadowed by the disaster that occurred before kick-off. Liverpool fans breached a fence separating the two groups of supporters and charged the Juventus fans. The resulting weight of people caused a retaining wall to collapse, killing 39 people and injuring hundreds. English clubs were banned indefinitely from European competition, with a condition that when the ban was lifted, Liverpool would serve an extra three-year ban. The ban eventually lasted for five years with Liverpool serving an additional year, clubs returning to European competition in the 1990–91 season. Juventus won the match 1–0 to win the European Cup for the first time.

Liverpool finished second in the First Division during the  1984–85 Football League. They were thirteen points behind champions Everton. Juventus finished the 1984–85 Serie A in sixth place, seven points behind champions Hellas Verona.

See also
Liverpool F.C. in European football
Juventus F.C. in European football

Notes

References

Bibliography

External links
1984 European Super Cup at UEFA

Super Cup
1984
Super Cup 1984
Super Cup 1984
Super Cup 1984
Super Cup 1984
Super Cup 1984
Sports competitions in Turin
1980s in Turin